Mark Mitchinson (born 6 July 1966) is an English-born New Zealand actor. He trained at the Guildhall School of Speech and Drama in London. He won an award for his portrayal of convicted murderer Colin Bouwer in the TV drama Bloodlines, and an award for Best Performance by an Actor award at the 2012 New Zealand Television Awards for playing Jan Molenaar in Siege. He was also cast in The Hobbit as Braga and Power Rangers Megaforce as the voice of Creepox.

Filmography

Film

Television

Video games

References

External links 

1966 births
Living people
New Zealand male film actors
New Zealand male television actors
New Zealand expatriates in England
Actors from London